

See also 
 Lists of fossiliferous stratigraphic units in Europe
 Geology of Germany

References 
 

 Germany
 
 
Germany geology-related lists